Hugo Siquet (born 9 July 2002) is a Belgian professional footballer who plays as a right-back for Cercle Brugge, on loan from SC Freiburg in the Bundesliga.

Club career
On 20 July 2020, Siquet signed his first professional contract with Standard Liège. He made his professional debut with Standard Liège in a 3–1 UEFA Europa League loss to Lech Poznań on 5 November 2020.

In early December 2021, it was announced that Siquet would join Bundesliga club SC Freiburg for the second half of the 2021–22 season. The transfer fee paid to Standard Liège  was reported as €4.5 million.

On 14 January 2023, Siquet joined Cercle Brugge on loan until the end of the 2022–23 season, with an option for the 2023–24 season.

References

External links
 
 ACFF Profile

2002 births
Living people
People from Marche-en-Famenne
Belgian footballers
Footballers from Luxembourg (Belgium)
Association football fullbacks
Belgium under-21 international footballers
Belgium youth international footballers
Belgian Pro League players
Bundesliga players
3. Liga players
Standard Liège players
SC Freiburg players
SC Freiburg II players
Cercle Brugge K.S.V. players
Belgian expatriate footballers
Belgian expatriate sportspeople in Germany
Expatriate footballers in Germany